Charles Howard Curran (20 March 1894 – 23 January 1972) was a Canadian entomologist who specialised in Diptera. Curran's main taxonomic interests were in brachyceran flies, particularly the flower flies Syrphidae, in which he described 723 species.

From 1922 to 1928 he worked as a specialist service in Diptera Entomology of Canada. In 1928, he was hired by the American Museum of Natural History as Assistant Curator and, from 1947 until his retirement in 1960, as Curator of Insects and Spiders. In 1931, he donated his collection to that institution: it has 10,000 specimens representing about 1,700 species including 400 types. He received in 1933 a Doctorate of Science at the University of Montreal with a thesis entitled The Families and Genera of North American Diptera. He was vice-president of the New York Entomological Society in 1936, president the following year.

References
Paul H. Arnaud Jr. et Thelma C. Owen (1981). Charles Howard Curran (1894-1972). Myia, 2 : 393 p.

Canadian entomologists
Dipterists
1894 births
1972 deaths
People associated with the American Museum of Natural History
People from Orillia
Université de Montréal alumni
20th-century Canadian zoologists